Twenty-two teams participated in the 2001 ICC Trophy, the seventh edition of the tournament. Four teams – France, Germany, Nepal, and Uganda – were making their tournament debuts. Four teams also did not return from the previous edition of the tournament in 1997 – Bangladesh and Kenya had been granted automatic qualification for the 2003 World Cup, West Africa were refused entry to Canada, and Italy unexpectedly withdrew due to a dispute over the eligibility of their players.

Argentina
Only players who appeared in at least one match at the tournament are listed. The leading run-scorer is marked with a dagger (†) and the leading wicket-taker with a double dagger (‡).

Coach:  Grant Dugmore

 Gastón Arizaga
 Martin Cortabarria
 Alejandro Ferguson
 Pablo Ferguson †
 Donald Forrester
 Tomas Francis
 Guillermo Kirschbaum

 Diego Lord
 Lucas Paterlini
 Matias Paterlini
 Hernan Pereyra ‡
 Andres Perez Rivero
 Christian Tuñon
 Malcolm van Steeden

Source: ESPNcricinfo

Bermuda
Only players who appeared in at least one match at the tournament are listed. The leading run-scorer is marked with a dagger (†) and the leading wicket-taker with a double dagger (‡).

Coach:  Mark Harper

 Dennis Archer
 Herbert Bascombe ‡
 Richard Basden
 Hasan Durham
 Dale Fox
 Ricky Hill
 Dwayne Leverock ‡
 Charlie Marshall

 Dennis Pilgrim
 Oliver Pitcher
 Clay Smith †
 Dexter Smith
 Albert Steede
 Janeiro Tucker
 Kwame Tucker

Source: ESPNcricinfo

Canada
Only players who appeared in at least one match at the tournament are listed. The leading run-scorer is marked with a dagger (†) and the leading wicket-taker with a double dagger (‡).

Coach:  Jeff Thomas

 Ashish Bagai
 Ian Billcliff
 Desmond Chumney
 Austin Codrington
 Melvin Croning
 John Davison
 Nicholas de Groot

 Muneeb Diwan
 Joseph Harris †
 Nicholas Ifill
 Davis Joseph
 Ishwar Maraj
 Barry Seebaran
 Sanjayan Thuraisingam ‡

Source: ESPNcricinfo

Denmark
Only players who appeared in at least one match at the tournament are listed. The leading run-scorer is marked with a dagger (†) and the leading wicket-taker with a double dagger (‡).

Coach:  Ole Mortensen

 Aftab Ahmed †
 Bobby Chawla
 Saad Hafeez
 Thomas Hansen
 Lars Hedegaard
 Morten Hedegaard
 Martin Jensen

 Amjad Khan
 Søren Kirk
 Frederik Klokker
 Mickey Lund
 Carsten Pedersen
 Lejf Slebsager
 Søren Vestergaard ‡

Source: ESPNcricinfo

East and Central Africa
Only players who appeared in at least one match at the tournament are listed. The leading run-scorer is marked with a dagger (†) and the leading wicket-taker with a double dagger (‡).

Coach: Ismail Hassan

 Kevin Cumings
 Arshad Dudhia
 Arif Ebrahim
 Chad Gomm
 Galoli Jetha
 Viru Kamania †

 Shamsher Madhani
 Raymond Msiagi
 Feroz Munshi
 Arif Pali ‡
 Yekesh Patel
 Mohamed Yusufali

Source: ESPNcricinfo

Fiji
Only players who appeared in at least one match at the tournament are listed. The leading run-scorer is marked with a dagger (†) and the leading wicket-taker with a double dagger (‡).

Player-coach:  Neil Maxwell

 Taione Batina
 Joji Bulabalavu
 Iniasi Cakacaka
 Johnny Hussain
 Maika Kamikamica
 Neil Maxwell †‡
 Iliesa Navatu

 Colin Rika
 Jone Seuvou
 Jone Sorovakatini
 Tavo Sorovakatini
 Atunaisi Tawatatau
 Seci Tuiwai
 Waisake Tukana

Source: ESPNcricinfo

France
Only players who appeared in at least one match at the tournament are listed. The leading run-scorer is marked with a dagger (†) and the leading wicket-taker with a double dagger (‡).

 Arun Ayyavooraju
 David Bordes
 Guy Brumant ‡
 Val Brumant
 Gareth Edwards
 Sulanga Hewawalandanage
 Simon Hewitt

 Shabbir Hussain †
 George James
 Peter Linton
 Philip Martin
 Ayeppin Rattiname
 Paul Wakefield

Source: ESPNcricinfo

Germany
Only players who appeared in at least one match at the tournament are listed. The leading run-scorer is marked with a dagger (†) and the leading wicket-taker with a double dagger (‡).

Coach:  Harold Rhodes

 Zaheer Ahmed
 Bruce Auchinleck
 Abdul Hamid Bhatti ‡
 Abdul Salam Bhatti
 Mark Brodersen
 Jakob Bumke
 Renald Buss

 Gerrit Müller †
 Shamas-ud-Din Khan
 Younis Khan
 Badar Munir
 Ayub Pasha
 Hans Petersen
 Tayyab Rathore

Source: ESPNcricinfo

Gibraltar
Only players who appeared in at least one match at the tournament are listed. The leading run-scorer is marked with a dagger (†) and the leading wicket-taker with a double dagger (‡).

Coach:  Richard Cox

 Gareth Balban
 Richard Buzaglo
 Tim Buzaglo
 Steve Cary
 Clive Clinton
 Gary De'Ath
 Ian Farrell

 Steven Gonzalez
 Paul Howard
 Daniel Johnson ‡
 Dave Robeson
 Christian Rocca †
 Stephen Shephard
 Chris Watkins

Source: ESPNcricinfo

Hong Kong
Only players who appeared in at least one match at the tournament are listed. The leading run-scorer is marked with a dagger (†) and the leading wicket-taker with a double dagger (‡).

Coach:  Andy Moles

 Stewart Brew
 Dyutish Chaudhuri
 Tabarak Dar ‡
 Mark Davies
 Mark Eames
 Alexander French
 Munir Hussain

 Jawaid Iqbal
 Mohammad Jamshaid
 Sher Lama
 Roy Lamsam
 Saleem Malik
 Rahul Sharma †
 Mohammad Zubair

Source: ESPNcricinfo

Ireland
Only players who appeared in at least one match at the tournament are listed. The leading run-scorer is marked with a dagger (†) and the leading wicket-taker with a double dagger (‡).

Coach:  Ken Rutherford

 Dekker Curry
 Peter Davy
 Matthew Dwyer
 Ryan Eagleson
 Derek Heasley
 Dom Joyce
 Ed Joyce †

 Kyle McCallan
 Adrian McCoubrey ‡
 Jason Molins
 Paul Mooney
 Andrew Patterson
 Mark Patterson
 Andrew White

Source: ESPNcricinfo

Israel
Only players who appeared in at least one match at the tournament are listed. The leading run-scorer is marked with a dagger (†) and the leading wicket-taker with a double dagger (‡).

Coach:  Herschel Gutman

 Raymond Aston
 Hillel Awasker
 Jacky Divekar
 Mahendra Jaiswar
 Benzie Kehimkar
 Gershon Massil
 Isaac Massil ‡

 Yefeth Nagavkar †
 Shalom Rubin
 Steven Shein
 David Silver
 Avi Talkar
 Adrian Vard
 Menashe Wadavkar

Source: ESPNcricinfo

Malaysia
Only players who appeared in at least one match at the tournament are listed. The leading run-scorer is marked with a dagger (†) and the leading wicket-taker with a double dagger (‡).

Coach:  Lyndsay Walker

 Sharani Ahmed
 Chew Pok Cheong
 Yazid Imran
 Rakesh Madhavan †
 Krishnamurthi Muniandy
 Marimuthu Muniandy
 Suresh Navaratnam

 Shankar Retinam
 Rohan Selvaratnam
 Suresh Singh
 Rohan Suppiah ‡
 Satgunasingam Vickneswaran ‡
 Matthew William

Source: ESPNcricinfo

Namibia
Only players who appeared in at least one match at the tournament are listed. The leading run-scorer is marked with a dagger (†) and the leading wicket-taker with a double dagger (‡).

Player-coach:  Lennie Louw

 Jan-Berrie Burger
 Louis Burger
 Morne Karg
 Danie Keulder †
 Bjorn Kotze
 Deon Kotze
 Lennie Louw

 Gavin Murgatroyd
 Rudi Scholtz
 Stephan Swanepoel
 Burton van Rooi ‡
 Melt van Schoor
 Rudi van Vuuren
 Riaan Walters

Source: ESPNcricinfo

Nepal
Only players who appeared in at least one match at the tournament are listed. The leading run-scorer is marked with a dagger (†) and the leading wicket-taker with a double dagger (‡).

Coach:  Aftab Baloch

 Pawan Agrawal
 Mahaboob Alam
 Dipendra Chaudhary
 Binod Das
 Navin Ghimire
 Paresh Lohani
 Parash Luniya ‡

 Sanjam Regmi
 Jay Sarraf †
 Durgaraj Sen
 Monick Shrestha
 Sandip Shrestha
 Ganesh Thakuri

Source: ESPNcricinfo

Netherlands
Only players who appeared in at least one match at the tournament are listed. The leading run-scorer is marked with a dagger (†) and the leading wicket-taker with a double dagger (‡).

Coach:  Emmerson Trotman

 Zulfiqar Ahmed
 Roger Bradley
 Tim de Leede
 Jacob-Jan Esmeijer
 Sebastiaan Gokke
 Asim Khan
 Feiko Kloppenburg

 Roland Lefebvre ‡
 Hendrik-Jan Mol
 Adeel Raja
 Reinout Scholte
 Klaas-Jan van Noortwijk †
 Robert van Oosterom
 Luuk van Troost

Source: ESPNcricinfo

Papua New Guinea
Only players who appeared in at least one match at the tournament are listed. The leading run-scorer is marked with a dagger (†) and the leading wicket-taker with a double dagger (‡).

Coach:  William Maha

 Jamie Brazier
 Rarva Dikana
 Toka Gaudi
 Jamie Iga
 Gima Keimelo
 Kopi Kopi
 Arua Loa

 Navu Maha
 Aukuma Noka
 John Ovia
 Tuku Raka ‡
 Arua Uda †
 Ross Vagi
 Keimelo Vuivagi

Source: ESPNcricinfo

Scotland
Only players who appeared in at least one match at the tournament are listed. The leading run-scorer is marked with a dagger (†) and the leading wicket-taker with a double dagger (‡).

Coach:  Jim Love and  Mike Hendrick

 Darryl Anderson
 John Blain ‡
 James Brinkley
 Asim Butt
 David Cox
 Dougie Lockhart
 Gregor Maiden
 Drew Parsons

 Bruce Patterson
 George Salmond
 Keith Sheridan ‡
 Colin Smith †
 Fraser Watts
 Greig Williamson
 Craig Wright

Source: ESPNcricinfo

Singapore
Only players who appeared in at least one match at the tournament are listed. The leading run-scorer is marked with a dagger (†) and the leading wicket-taker with a double dagger (‡).

Coach:  Bruce Yardley

 Narayanan Balasubramaniam
 Joshua Dearing †‡
 Kiran Deshpande
 Shehzad Haque
 Rishi Kaul
 Sunder Mani
 Peter Muruthi

 Johann Pieris
 Zeng Renchun
 Andrew Scott
 Sandeep Seth
 Mohamed Shoib
 Zubin Shroff
 Ravi Thambinayagam

Source: ESPNcricinfo

Uganda
Only players who appeared in at least one match at the tournament are listed. The leading run-scorer is marked with a dagger (†) and the leading wicket-taker with a double dagger (‡).

Coach:  Andrew Meya

 Kenneth Kamyuka
 Junior Kwebiha ‡
 Keith Legesi
 John Lubia
 Charles Lwanga †
 Tendo Mbazzi
 Benjamin Musoke

 Richard Mwami
 Frank Nsubuga
 Simon Nsubuga
 Henry Oketcho
 Richard Okia
 Joel Olwenyi
 Lawrence Sematimba

Source: ESPNcricinfo

United Arab Emirates
Only players who appeared in at least one match at the tournament are listed. The leading run-scorer is marked with a dagger (†) and the leading wicket-taker with a double dagger (‡).

Coach:  Naved Anjum

 Ahmed Nadeem †
 Arshad Ali
 Asim Saeed
 Ausaf Ali
 Babar Malik
 Danish Jabbar
 Khurram Khan ‡

 Leon Carlo
 Mahmood Pir Baksh
 Mohammad Atif
 Mohammad Nadeem
 Mohammad Tauqir
 Nasir Siddiqi
 Saeed-al-Saffar

Source: ESPNcricinfo

United States
Only players who appeared in at least one match at the tournament are listed. The leading run-scorer is marked with a dagger (†) and the leading wicket-taker with a double dagger (‡).

Coach:  Syed Abid Ali

 Rohan Alexander †
 Aijaz Ali
 Faoud Bacchus
 Donovan Blake
 David Hoilett
 Naseer Islam ‡
 Nasir Javed

 Mark Johnson
 Michael Springer
 Richard Staple
 Dave Wallace
 Rashid Zia
 Joy Zinto

Source: ESPNcricinfo

Withdrawn teams

Italy
Italy named a fourteen-man squad for the tournament in April 2001. However, following an ICC meeting in June, the player qualification rules for the tournament were altered, which had the effect of making four Italian squad members ineligible. The Italian team withdrew in protest.

Coach:  Doug Ferguson

 Kamal Karyiyawasam (c)
 Alessandro Bonora
 Andrea Corbellari
 Samantha de Mel
 Peter Di Venuto
 Benito Giordano
 Hemantha Jayasena

 Riccardo Maggio
 Warren Mazzoncini
 Andrea Parisi
 Akhlaq Qureshi
 Joe Scuderi
 Aamir Shah
 Valerio Zuppirioli

West Africa

All seventeen members of the West African team's touring party (14 players and three officials) were refused visas to Canada, forcing the team to withdraw from the tournament only a few days before its start.

Coach:  Cyril Panda

 Adedapo Adegoyke
 Wale Adeoye
 Kofi Anaefi
 Henry Anthony
 Muhammad Kamara
 Alex Kanyako
 Sao Kanyako

 Albert Kpundeh
 Sahr Kpundeh
 Charles Okodua
 Oladotun Olatunji
 Olubunmi Olufawo
 Joseph Talleh
 Okun Ukpong

Sources

External links
 CricketArchive: Averages by teams, ICC Trophy 2001
 ESPNcricinfo: ICC Trophy, 2001 / Statistics

Cricket squads
ICC World Cup Qualifier